Vittorio Fontanella (born 17 March 1953 in Chiampo, Vicenza) is a former middle distance runner from Italy.

Biography
He set his personal best (3:35.93) in the men's 1500 meter in 1981.
He also owned the Italian national record in the mile until 1991, set in Zurich during the same competition in which he set the national record in the 1500m event. He also held the Italian national record in the 3000m event (7:45.02, in Bologna 12 September 1981). He is currently a gymnastic teacher in the public school system.

Olympic results

National titles
Vittorio Fontanella has won 4 times the individual national championship.
3 wins in the 1500 metres (1975, 1976, 1979)
1 win in the 800 metres indoor (1973)

See also
 Italian all-time lists - 1500 metres
 List of Italian records in masters athletics

References

External links
 

1953 births
Living people
Italian male middle-distance runners
Athletes (track and field) at the 1980 Summer Olympics
Olympic athletes of Italy
Sportspeople from Vicenza
Italian masters athletes